Nyceryx draudti is a moth of the  family Sphingidae. It is known from Peru.

The wingspan is about 67 mm. It is very similar to Nyceryx stuarti.

Adults are probably on wing year round.

References

Nyceryx
Moths described in 1926